The Dictionary of Modern Greek, more commonly known as Babiniotis Dictionary (Λεξικό Μπαμπινιώτη), is a well-known dictionary of Modern Greek published in Greece by Lexicology Centre and supervised by Greek linguist Georgios Babiniotis.

Editions 

The dictionary has gone through several editions:

 1998, first edition
 2002, second edition, reprinted (with minor corrections and optimizations) in 2003, 2004, 2006
 July 2008, third edition, 2,032 pages, some notable new words entered in the Greek language include viagra (βιάγκρα), bluetooth (μπλουτούθ), bio-fuel (βιοκαύσιμο), and blogger (μπλόγκερ).
 2012, fourth edition, 2,256 pages.  
 2019, fifth edition, 2,316 pages.

Quotations 

 The giant called Greek language can't be tamed easily! The language constantly evolves, ideas and the world change, just as our communication needs do (Ο "γίγαντας" που λέγεται Ελληνική γλώσσα δεν δαμάζεται εύκολα! Η γλώσσα εξελίσσεται συνεχώς, τα δεδομένα αλλάζουν, ο κόσμος μας μεταβάλλεται και μαζί αλλάζουν οι επικοινωνιακές μας ανάγκες)

About the book

[this book] is a landmark in Greek linguistics and lexicography. It provides the largest scale picture of the Greek language after the demise of diglossia, offering a plethora of invaluable information about the multiple resources of Greek. Its breadth and scope render it a useful tool for teachers of Greek, for learners, translators, creative writers, and—generally—anyone who uses the language with some frequency. However, it is not only its size that makes Babiniotis’s dictionary an outstanding work. Its distinctive character is that, with the exception of Kriaras’s smaller and less-broadly focused work (1995), it is the only dictionary of the contemporary Greek language compiled by a professional linguist on the basis of expert rather than amateurish standards and principles. This major oeuvre by the doyen of modern Greek linguistics is bound to constitute one of the standard reference works for years to come, alongside Stamatakos’s and Dimitrakos’s earlier accomplishments.

This massive volume of 2,064 pages was met with huge public debate and became a bestseller. It offers 150,000 "words and phrases" and is credited (by Goutsos) with giving the fullest picture of Greek since the demise of diglossia and having the most scientifically arranged lemmata, trying not to give synonyms as definitions, and including comment boxes with both prescriptive and descriptive mini-essays.

See also 
 Babiniotis Dictionary court case
 Triantafyllidis Dictionary

References

Bibliography
 Peter Mackridge, Review of the Dictionary of the Modern Greek Language, G. Babiniotis, Journal of Greek Linguistics 2:1 (2002)

External links
 Babiniotis Dictionary on the Lexicology Centre website

Modern Greek dictionaries